Route 68 is an east–west state highway in the U.S. state of Connecticut connecting the towns of Durham and Naugatuck.

Route description
Route 68 begins at Route 63 in Naugatuck.  After crossing the Naugatuck River, it overpasses the Route 8 expressway, with access via Union Street (SR 723) and North Main Street (SR 710).  Route 68 then leaves the Naugatuck River Valley and ascends to Prospect, where it intersects Route 69 in the center of town.  It then descends once again into Cheshire, where it joins Route 70 for a 3.1 mile concurrency.  In the center of Cheshire, the concurrency becomes a 0.15 mile triplex with Route 10.  After the Route 70 concurrency ends, Route 68 becomes a 4 lane road as it enters Wallingford.  The road narrows to 2 lanes as it passes through Yalesville where it intersects Route 150.  After passing under the Wilbur Cross Parkway (Route 15) without an interchange, it meets US 5 at a one-quadrant interchange.  Route 68 becomes a 4-lane undivided, partially access controlled road for the next 2.3 miles to its junction with I-91 at Exit 15.  After overpassing I-91 and passing a couple of business parks, Route 68 becomes a 2 lane road once again.  It then enters Durham, where it passes the southern end of Route 157 before ending at Route 17 in the center of town.

History
The road connecting Naugatuck and Cheshire was designated in 1922 as State Highway 325. In the 1932 state highway renumbering, former Highway 325 was renumbered to
Route 68. The route was later extended east to Middlefield in 1966 along former SR 607 (Wallingford to Middlefield) and SR 730 (Cheshire to Wallingford) via an overlap with Route 70. In 1973 and 1974, parts of Route 68 were rerouted in Wallingford.

Junction list

References

External links

068
Transportation in New Haven County, Connecticut
Transportation in Middlesex County, Connecticut